The 2022 MLS Next Pro season is the inaugural season of MLS Next Pro, the reserve league of Major League Soccer. It is the first season since 2014 where MLS had a standalone reserve league, the previous season being the MLS Reserve League. Including both MLS Next Pro and the MLS Reserve League, it is the ninth season of a reserve league operated by MLS. The league is sanctioned as a third division league by U.S. Soccer.

A total of 21 clubs, 20 MLS reserve teams and one independent team (Rochester New York FC) participate in the 2022 season. The regular season began on March 25 and was concluded on September 18, 2022.

Columbus Crew 2 defeated St. Louis City SC 2 4-1 in the inaugural MLS Next Pro Cup final on October 8.

Teams

Stadiums and locations

Personnel and sponsorship

Regular season 
The regular season will feature 24 matches in a mostly regionalized schedule. Teams will play two or three games against teams in their conference. Only four matches total will be played between teams in opposite conferences. Each conference will be divided into divisions of five or six teams for scheduling.

Conference standings

Eastern Conference

Western Conference

Overall table

Player statistics

Goals

Hat-tricks 

Notes
(H) – Home team(A) – Away team4 – Scored 4 goals

Assists

Clean sheets

Playoffs 
There was an eight-team playoff, where the top finisher in each division qualified, along with the next two top finishers in each conference. Seeding within each conference was based on conference standings, regardless of being division champions.

Qualifying teams

Eastern Conference
 Columbus Crew 2 - Central Division Winner
 Toronto FC II - Northeast Division Winner
 Philadelphia Union II - Conference Wild Card #1
 Rochester New York FC - Conference Wild Card #2

Western Conference
 St. Louis City SC 2 - Frontier Division Winner
 Tacoma Defiance - Pacific Division Winner
 Houston Dynamo 2 - Conference Wild Card #1
 North Texas SC - Conference Wild Card #2

Bracket

Conference Semifinals

Eastern Conference

Western Conference

Conference Finals

Eastern Conference

Western Conference

2022 MLS Next Pro Cup

Most Valuable Player: Marco Micaletto (Columbus Crew 2)

League awards

Individual awards

MLS Next Pro Best XI

Monthly awards

See also 
 2022 Major League Soccer season

References

External links 
 MLS Next Pro

MLS Next Pro
Mls Next Pro
Mls Next Pro
MLS Next Pro seasons